Yurua District is one of the four districts of the province Atalaya in Peru.

References

Districts of the Atalaya Province
Districts of the Ucayali Region